La Pryor is a census-designated place (CDP) in Zavala County, Texas, United States. Its population was 1,643 at the 2010 census.

The town is named for Col. Isaac (Ike) T. Pryor, who in the 1880s owned a ranch that included the site of the community.

The Nueces River crosses U.S. Highway 83 north of La Pryor.

The community has within its limits branches of the Texas Department of Transportation and the Zavala County Bank.

Geography
La Pryor is located at  (28.943879, -99.844349).

According to the United States Census Bureau, the CDP has a total area of 2.7 square miles (6.9 km2), all of it land.

Demographics

2020 census

As of the 2020 United States census, there were 1,294 people, 365 households, and 286 families residing in the CDP.

2000 census
As of the census of 2000, 1,491 people, 462 households, and 368 families were residing in the CDP. The population density was 556.5 people per square mile (214.8/km2). The 571 housing units averaged 213.1 per mi2 (82.3/km2). The racial makeup of the CDP was 52.72% White, 0.07% African American, 0.47% Native American, 0.07% Asian, 43.46% from other races, and 3.22% from two or more races. Hispanics or Latinos of any race were 88.26% of the population.

Of the 462 households, 45.0% had children under the age of 18 living with them, 61.0% were married couples living together, 14.5% had a female householder with no husband present, and 20.3% were not families. About 19.3% of all households were made up of individuals, and 11.3% had someone living alone who was 65 years of age or older. The average household size was 3.23, and the average family size was 3.74.

In the CDP, the age distribution was 35.2% under 18, 9.6% from 18 to 24, 25.3% from 25 to 44, 20.3% from 45 to 64, and 9.7% who were 65  or older. The median age was 28 years. For every 100 females, there were 93.4 males. For every 100 females age 18 and over, there were 90.5 males.

The median income for a household in the CDP was $18,385, and for a family was $21,304. Males had a median income of $19,125 versus $15,125 for females. The per capita income for the CDP was $10,036. About 37.4% of families and 41.2% of the population were below the poverty line, including 48.8% of those under age 18 and 36.1% of those age 65 or over.

Education
La Pryor is served by the La Pryor Independent School District.

References

External links
 La Pryor ISD

Census-designated places in Texas
Census-designated places in Zavala County, Texas